Halolaguna biferrinella is a moth in the family Lecithoceridae. It is found in Malaysia and Indonesia.

Adults are chalybeous, the wings moderately broad. The forewings are rounded at the tips, with a ferruginous transverse interior line and a broad ferruginous band, which is narrower hindward and extends nearly to the border, and includes a longitudinal subcostal chalybeous streak. These two hues are divided from each other by black lines. The hindwings are aeneous.

References

Moths described in 1864
Halolaguna